Business Valuation Standards (BVS) are codes of practice that are used in business valuation.  Examples of business appraisal standards are as follows:
 CICBV Practice Standards. Published by the CBV Institute.
 Uniform Standards of Professional Appraisal Practice (USPAP). Standards 9 and 10 cover business valuation and reporting standards. Published by the Appraisal Foundation.
 International Valuation Standards. Published by the International Valuation Standards Council.
 Statement on Standards for Valuation Services (SSVS No 1). Published by the American Institute of CPAs.
In addition, each of the three major United States valuation societies—the American Society of Appraisers (ASA), American Institute of Certified Public Accountants (CPA/ABV), and the National Association of Certified Valuators and Analysts (NACVA)—has its own set of Business Valuation Guidelines, which it requires all of its accredited members to adhere to.  The AICPA's standards are published as Statement on Standards for Valuation Services No.1 and the ASA's guidelines are published as the ASA Business Valuation Guidelines, which largely follow the USPAP Standard requirements.  All AICPA members are required to follow SSVS1.  Additionally, the majority of the State Accountancy Boards have adopted VS Section 100 for CPAs licensed in their state.

Features 
All of the standards have the following in common:
A requirement of independenceThe appraiser must not act in favor of the client or any other party.
A requirement that fees be not contingent on appraised valueFees based upon, for example, a percentage of the valuation are unethical and are not allowed.
A requirement that all limiting conditions be explicitly statedThe reader must be informed of all assumptions made as part of the valuation.  For example, if a lawsuit is pending against a business, the valuation must explicitly state that the impact of the outcome of the lawsuit will have an unknown effect on the value, and what assumptions about the outcome have or have not been made.
A requirement that all people participating in the valuation be disclosedAll professionals participating in a valuation report must sign it, and must have certification of their independence, fee arrangements, and other factors.
A requirement that all information sources be statedReaders must be able to replicate valuation reports for themselves.  Therefore, all sources used in compiling the report must be stated.
Minimum requirements for contents of reportsThe precise minimum requirements vary from society to society, but roughly they include the purpose and scope of the assignment, the standard of value and specific valuation date being employed, an identification of the specific interest being evaluated, the relevant state and federal laws that govern the entity being valued, the scope of the procedures employed during valuation, the nature and history of the business, the historical financial information on the business, a thorough financial analysis of the business comparing the business's performance with industry trends, an overview of the industry in which the business operates and the impact of market conditions on the business, and the current investment climate.

Concepts employed 
This is a list of some of the common concepts employed in business valuation that are defined by business valuation standards.
Marketability discountIn the ASA BVS, a marketability discount is "an amount or percentage deducted from an equity interest to reflect lack of marketability"

References

Further reading 
  — the full text of the Statement on Standards for Valuation Services No.1,ASA Business Valuation Standards, IBA Business Appraisal Standards, IBA Code of Ethics, IBA Business Valuation Guidelines, and NACVA Professional Standards

Fundamental analysis
Valuation (finance)
Valuation professionals